was a private junior college in Midori-ku, Saitama, Japan. Established in 1971, it closed in 2003. It concentrated on French and English foreign language studies. The school was affiliated with the Canadian Catholic Church.

Academic departments
 English
 French

See also 
 Aomori Akenohoshi Junior College

References

Japanese junior colleges
Educational institutions established in 1971
Private universities and colleges in Japan
Universities and colleges in Saitama Prefecture
1971 establishments in Japan
2003 disestablishments in Japan